Hannastown Farm, also known as the William Steel Farm, is a national historic district and farm located at Salem Township, Westmoreland County, Pennsylvania. It encompasses nine contributing buildings, one contributing site, and one contributing structure. They include a mansion house (1866-1867), an overseer's house with a kitchen house, bank barn (1868) with silo, a wagon shed, a tractor shed, a garage, and related dependencies. The house is a 2 1/2-story, "L"-shaped, red brick Italianate style dwelling. The property also includes a prehistoric archaeological site.

It was added to the National Register of Historic Places in 1994.

References

Farms on the National Register of Historic Places in Pennsylvania
Historic districts on the National Register of Historic Places in Pennsylvania
Italianate architecture in Pennsylvania
Houses completed in 1867
Buildings and structures in Westmoreland County, Pennsylvania
National Register of Historic Places in Westmoreland County, Pennsylvania